Carabus acutithorax is a species of ground beetle in the large genus Carabus.

References

acutithorax
Insects described in 1989
Insects of China